Linder may refer to:

Places
Linder (river), Bavaria, Germany
Linder Peak, Antarctica
Linder Glacier, Antarctica
Linder Township, Greene County, Illinois

People

Surname
Alex Linder (born 1966), founder of Vanguard News Network
Allan Linder (born 1966), American artist
Anders Linder (born 1941), Swedish actor and jazz musician
Astrid Linder, Swedish researcher in motor vehicle safety 
Béla Linder (1876–1962), Hungarian army officer and government minister
Ben Linder (1959–1987), American engineer killed by Nicaraguan Contra rebels
Bengt Linder (1929–1985), Swedish writer and journalist
Cec Linder (1921–1992), Polish-born Canadian actor
Clarence Hugo Linder (1903–1994), American electrical engineer
David H. Linder (1899-1946), American mycologist
Dick Linder (1923–1959), American race car driver
Ernst Linder (1868–1943), Swedish general and Olympic gold medal horseman
Harold F. Linder (1900–1981), banker, businessman and politician
James Linder (born 1954), American doctor, professor and businessman
Joe Linder (1886–1948), American ice hockey player
John Linder (born 1942), American politician, former U.S. Representative from Georgia
John Linder (Pennsylvania politician) (born 1947), American politician, Mayor of Chester
Kate Linder (born 1947), American actress
Krister Linder (born 1970), Swedish electronic musician
Kurt Linder (born 1933), German former footballer and coach
Maud Linder (1924–2017), French journalist, film historian and documentary film director
Max Linder (1883–1925), French pioneer of silent film
Michael Linder, American radio and television journalist and producer
Staffan Burenstam Linder (1931–2000), Swedish economist and conservative politician, twice Minister of Trade
Virginia Linder (born 1953), Associate Justice of the Oregon Supreme Court

Given name
Linder Sterling (born 1954), British visual and performance artist and musician known by the single name Linder

Things
A type of expensive stone referenced in the fictional children's novel Princess Academy

See also 
Linder Radio Group, a media company
Linder v. United States, a Supreme Court case
Linder hypothesis, an economics conjecture about international trade patterns
Lindor (disambiguation)